Madshus is a Norwegian ski and ski-equipment manufacturer, located at Biri in Gjøvik. The company produces cross-country skis, ski boots and poles.

History 

Madshus is one of the world's oldest ski manufacturer. The first Madshus skis were produced by Martin Madshus in 1906 in a barn in Vardal near Gjøvik. The company was moved to Lillehammer in 1936, and then to Biri in 1972. In 1988, the factory was bought by K2 Sports Inc, but the skis are still produced at Biri. Some Madshus skis have been made in China (e.g. some 2013-2014 Glittertinds).

Madshus is one of only two remaining Norwegian ski manufacturers, the other being Åsnes Ski.

External links
 Official website

Sporting goods manufacturers of Norway
Ski equipment manufacturers
Norwegian brands